The Landmark Medical Center is a private, not-for-profit hospital located in Woonsocket, Rhode Island and with another unit, Rehabilitation Hospital of Rhode Island in North Smithfield, Rhode Island.  The facility is a teaching hospital for New York Medical College and is host to one of three of its internal medicine programs.

History
In 1988 the hospital was created as a merger between Woonsocket Hospital and Fogarty Hospital of North Smithfield. The merged hospitals had been providing healthcare for nearly 130 years.  The hospital provides emergency, diagnostic, medical, surgical, cancer, cardiac, pain management, and obstetric care."  It is certified as a Primary stroke center and is equipped with catheterization labs for coronary intervention.  The hospital also provides inpatient psychiatric care.

See also
List of hospitals in Rhode Island

References

Hospitals in Rhode Island
1988 establishments in Rhode Island
Hospitals established in 1988
Woonsocket, Rhode Island